Edward Tucker (died 1739) of Weymouth, Dorset, was a British merchant and politician who sat in the House of Commons from 1727 to 1737.
 
Tucker was the son of Edward Tucker of Weymouth and his wife  Joane. His father was a merchant adventurer of Weymouth, who was imprisoned as a Quaker in 1665. Tucker was also a merchant of Weymouth and was Mayor of Weymouth in 1702 and1705. He succeeded his father in 1707, and held a government lease of some of the quarries at Portland.  In 1714 he obtained the post of supervisor of the Portland quarries, which had considerable electoral influence at Weymouth and Melcombe Regis. Tucker joined forces with George Bubb Dodington, who took care of their interests at Westminster, while Tucker managed the borough. He was mayor again in 1716, 1721 and 1725.
 
Tucker was returned unopposed as Member of Parliament for Weymouth and Melcombe Regis  at a by-election on 30 January 1727. His post as supervisor of the quarries was incompatible with a seat in the House of Commons, so he passed it on to one of his sons. He was elected in a contest at the 1727 general election.  In Parliament he voted with the Government on the army in 1732 and on the repeal of the Septennial Act in 1734  It would appear that he was ill with rheumatism, palsy and dropsy but was returned unopposed at the 1734 general election. He was Mayor of Weymouth again in 1735. His son, John, was also returned for Weymouth and Melcombe Regis in 1735. They were among the five ‘friends’ of Dodington who all voted against an opposition motion for an increase in the allowance of the Prince of Wales on 22 February 1737 in response to a request to Dodington from Walpole. Later in 1737 he took up the post of supervisor of the Portland quarries again and vacated his seat in Parliament on 10 March 1737.

Tucker died  on 5 April 1739. He was twice married and had two sons and three daughters.

References

1739 deaths
Members of the Parliament of Great Britain for English constituencies
British MPs 1722–1727
British MPs 1727–1734
British MPs 1734–1741